Midreshet HaRova is a Religious Zionist Jewish seminary located in the Jewish Quarter of Jerusalem's Old City. The all-female seminary is known for its strong push for Aliyah. Amongst the plethora of post-High School seminaries for non-Israelis, the Overseas program is regarded as  well rounded, inviting for all levels of learning.

Founded in 1993, it now has more than a dozen programs, for women of all ages from a variety of backgrounds and nationalities. The post-high school yearlong Overseas Program attracts students across the globe; students in previous years have come from Argentina, South Africa, Australia, New Zealand, United Kingdom, Italy, Germany, Canada, and from  different states in the U.S.. Israelis who have completed their Sherut Leumi (mandatory national service) also partake in a yearlong study program in the Midrasha. Overseas students are able to live alongside the Israelis in several HaRova-owned apartments, while those who choose to live in the dorm building only live with non-Israelis.

Between 50%-60% of the classes are taught in Hebrew, and the rest are given in English. An Ulpan is also offered for students wishing to learn Hebrew. Classes are offered in various subjects such as Torah, Nevi'im (Prophets), Ketuvim (Writings), Machshava (Jewish thought), Gemara, Halacha (Jewish Law), and independent study.

The director is Rabbi David Milston, a British national and alumni of Yeshivat Har Etzion.

References

External links 
 

Jewish seminaries
Orthodox Jewish schools for women
Modern Orthodox Judaism in Israel
Educational institutions established in 1993
1993 establishments in Israel